Osofsky is a surname. Notable people with the surname include:

 Aileen Osofsky (1926–2010), American community leader, philanthropist, and bridge player
 Barbara L. Osofsky (born 1937), American mathematician
 Howard Osofsky (born 1935), American gynecologist, obstetrician, and psychiatrist, husband of Joy
 Joy Osofsky, American psychologist, wife of Howard
 Lisa Osofsky (born 1961), American-British lawyer
 Steven Osofsky, American veterinarian

See also
Ossowski